The 2015 Hampton Pirates football team represented Hampton University in the 2015 NCAA Division I FCS football season. They were led by second year head coach Connell Maynor and played their home games at Armstrong Stadium. They were a member of the Mid-Eastern Athletic Conference. They finished the season 6–5, 5–3 in MEAC play to finish in fifth place.

Schedule

Source: Schedule

References

Hampton
Hampton Pirates football seasons
Hampton Pirates football